Ioannis Kourkourikis (born 5 March 1971) is a Greek rower. He competed in the men's lightweight double sculls event at the 1996 Summer Olympics.

References

External links
 

1971 births
Living people
Greek male rowers
Olympic rowers of Greece
Rowers at the 1996 Summer Olympics
Sportspeople from Giannitsa